The 2019–20 Mississippi Valley State Delta Devils basketball team represented Mississippi Valley State University during the 2019–20 NCAA Division I men's basketball season. The Delta Devils were led by first-year head coach Lindsey Hunter and played their home games at the Harrison HPER Complex in Itta Bena, Mississippi as members of the Southwestern Athletic Conference. They finished the season 3–27, 3–15 in SWAC play to finish in a tie for ninth place. They failed to qualify for the SWAC tournament.

Previous season 
The Delta Devils finished the 2018–19 season 6–26 overall, 4–14 in SWAC play to finish in a tie for last place. On March 25, 2019, the school announced that head coach Andre Payne would not return as head coach after five seasons. On April 22, the school announced that former NBA player and coach Lindsey Hunter had been named head coach.

Regular season
On November 8, Utah defeated the Delta Devils 143–49 to set an NCAA record for largest margin of victory (94 points) over a Division I opponent.

Two players recently received "Delta Devil of the Day" awards. The recipients were: Richard "Big Tuna" Rivers, a 6' 11" center from Pennsylvania and Caleb Hunter, a 5' 11" guard from Michigan.

The game against North American University is a non-countable game.

Roster

Schedule and results  

|-
!colspan=9 style=| Exhibition

|-
!colspan=9 style=| Non-conference regular season

|-
!colspan=9 style=| SWAC regular season

Source

References 

Mississippi Valley State Delta Devils basketball seasons
Mississippi Valley State
Mississippi Valley State Delta Devils
Mississippi Valley State Delta Devils